Rockhampton Ring Road is a  proposed highway from  on the Capricorn Highway south-west of  to  on the Bruce Highway to the north-east of Rockhampton, in Queensland, Australia. It will enable through traffic to bypass the Rockhampton CBD, avoiding 19 sets of traffic signals, and will eliminate delays caused by flooding on sections of the Bruce Highway within the city.

Funding and program status
As at July 2022 funding of $1.065 billion has been allocated, planning is complete, and the business case is being assessed by Infrastructure Australia. Detailed design has commenced, with construction expected to be complete by 2026.

Preparatory works
The projects described below will facilitate the construction of intersections at either end of the ring road.

Capricorn Highway duplication

Rockhampton northern access upgrade
A project to upgrade the northern access to Rockhampton in the vicinity of the intersection of the Bruce Highway with Rockhampton–Yeppoon Road, at a cost of $194 million, was completed in August 2021.

Route description
The road will start at an intersection with the Capricorn Highway in Fairy Bower. This will be at a three-way roundabout with a high level slip lane for traffic approaching from Gracemere. The road will run north-west, north, and north-east, crossing over several local roads and lagoons, before reaching a three-way roundabout in Pink Lily, known as the West Rockhampton Connection. From there a new exit and entry road will lead south to Rockhampton–Ridgelands Road, giving access to Rockhampton Airport, Rockhampton Hospital, and the CBD. This exit and entry road is part of an additional  of new roadway included in the project.

Continuing as a four-lane highway, the road will run north-east, north, and north-east again before crossing the Fitzroy River into Parkhurst and reaching an intersection with Alexandra Street, which will provide access to the  CBD. From there the road will continue generally north-east, crossing over the railway line and meeting the Bruce Highway and Rockhampton–Yeppoon Road at a four-way signalised intersection.

Major intersections
Intermediate distances are not yet available. The entire road is in the Rockhampton local government area.

Notes

References 

Roads in Queensland